The City of Colchester is a local government district with city status, in Essex, England, named after its main settlement, Colchester.

Demography
The Essex County Standard of September 4, 2009 said that "Government estimates" made Colchester the most populous district in the county: its officially acknowledged population is second highest among non-London boroughs, behind Northampton.

According to the Office for National Statistics as of 2008, Colchester had a population of approximately 181,000. Average life expectancy was 78.7 for males. and 83.3 for females.

Based on ethnic groups, predominantly of 92% of the population is White (87.5% British, 0.7% Irish and 3.8% Other White), Asians were the second largest making up 3.6% (0.8% Indian, 0.2% Pakistani, 0.2% Bangladeshi and 1% Chinese, other 1.4%), Black people constituted 1.4% (0.3% Caribbean, 1% African, 0.1% other), those of mixed race made up 1.8%, 0.6% were Arab and there were 0.4% from other ethnic groups.

In the 2011 census, 57.7% identified themselves as Christian, while 31.4% had no affiliation to a religion. Of other religions, 1.6% identified as Muslim, 0.7% Hindu, 0.6% Buddhist, 0.2% Jewish, 0.1% Sikh, 0.5% others, and 7.3% did not answer. There are more than 100 churches located in Colchester: other religious places of worship include the Colchester Islamic Cultural Association and the Jewish Community Synagogue.

History
Colchester is the first founded city in Britain, being founded by the Romans as their capital. Colchester was one of the three Roman cities attacked by Boadicea. It is home to many historic buildings, including the Norman castle, built on the remains of a Roman temple; the Tudor town house, now Red Lion Inn, which was owned by the Howard family; a Saxon church and many more.

As part of Queen's Platinum Jublilee Celebration in 2022, Colchester was granted City Status, with it confirmed by Letters Patent dated 5 September 2022.

Governance

Elections to Colchester City Council are held in three out of every four years, with one third of the 51 seats on the council being elected at each election. Since the 1998 election no party has held a majority on the council apart from the period between 2007 and the 2008 election when the Conservative party had a majority. Between the 2008 and 2021 elections the council was run by a coalition of Liberal Democrats, Labour and independent groups. From 2021-22 it was run by Conservative and Independent coalition. At the 2022 election it reverted to a Liberal Democrat, Labour and Green coalition. In October 2022 one green councillor left the party and became independent, and both remaining Highwoods Independent councillors resigned their seats. The vacant seats were won by one Liberal Democrat and one Labour councillor in November 2022. In December 2022 the Green Party group leader defected to the Labour Party.
The council is composed of the following councillors:

Places in Colchester District
Abberton
Aldham
Birch
Boxted
Braiswick
Chappel
Colchester
Copford
Dedham
Easthorpe
Eight Ash Green
Fingringhoe
Fordham
Great Horkesley
Great Tey
Great Wigborough
Inworth
Langham
Langham Moor
Layer Breton
Layer de la Haye
Layer Marney
Little Horkesley
Little Tey
Little Wigborough
Marks Tey
Mersea Island
Mount Bures
Rowhedge
Salcott
Smythe's Green
Stanway
Tiptree
Virley
Wakes Colne
West Bergholt
Wivenhoe

See also
List of Mayors of Colchester

References 

 
Non-metropolitan districts of Essex
Boroughs in England